Bulbotrachystola is a genus of beetles in the family Cerambycidae, containing a single known species, Bulbotrachystola bulbifera. It was described by Stephan von Breuning in 1940.

References

Morimopsini
Beetles described in 1940
Monotypic Cerambycidae genera